The Boer republics (sometimes also referred to as Boer states) were independent, self-governing republics formed (especially in the last half of the 19th century) by Dutch-speaking inhabitants of the Cape Colony and their descendants. The founders – variously named Trekboers, Boers and Voortrekkers – settled mainly in the middle, northern, north-eastern and eastern parts of present-day South Africa. Two of the Boer Republics achieved international recognition and complete independence: the South African Republic (ZAR; or Transvaal) and the Orange Free State. The republics did not provide for the separation of church and state, initially allowing only the Dutch Reformed Church, and later also other Protestant churches in the Calvinist tradition. The republics came to an end after the Second Boer War of 1899–1902, which resulted in British annexation and later (in 1910) incorporation of their lands into the Union of South Africa.

Background

The Dutch East India Company (VOC) first issued land to the Free Burghers in 1657. The Free Burghers established two colonies at the Liesbeeck River near Rondebosch in the Western Cape. Following an application process, the Free Burghers formed two groups, the first group named their settlement Harman's Colony and the second group named theirs Stephen's Colony. By 1670, the VOC decided to grant additional land to the Free Burghers in order to increase grain production for the purpose of sustainability since grain had to be imported. The Free Burgher settlements gradually expanded towards the interior of South Africa.

The United Kingdom took over from the Netherlands as the colonial power at the Cape of Good Hope in 1806. Subsequently, a number of its Dutch-speaking inhabitants trekked inland, first in smaller numbers, then in groups as large as almost a hundred people, after 1834 even in groups of hundreds. There were many reasons why the Boers left the Cape Colony; among the initial reasons were the language laws. The British had proclaimed the English language as the only language of the Cape Colony and prohibited the use of the Dutch language. As the Bible, churches, schools and culture of many of the settlers were Dutch, this caused a lot of friction. Britain abolished slavery in 1834 and allocated the sum of 1,200,000 British pounds as recompense for the Dutch settlers' slaves. The Dutch settlers disputed the requirement that they had to lodge their claims in Britain and objected that the value of the slaves was many times the allocated amount. This caused further dissatisfaction among the Dutch settlers.

Boer migrants were referred to as the Voortrekkers during the time of the Great Trek, several mass movements which occurred during the 1830s and 1840s. On the 22nd of January 1837 Piet Retief addressed a letter to the British Colonial Administration in which he concluded "We quit this colony under the full assurance that the English Government has nothing more to require of us, and will allow us to govern ourselves without its interference in future".

Republic of Swellendam
By 1795 the dissatisfaction towards the Dutch East India Company caused the burghers of Swellendam to revolt, and on 17 June 1795 they declared themselves a Republic. Hermanus Steyn was appointed as President of the Republic of Swellendam. The burghers of Swellendam started to call themselves "national burghers" – after the style of the French Revolution. However, the Republic was short-lived and was ended on 4 November 1795 when the Cape was occupied by the Kingdom of Great Britain.

Republic of the Graaff-Reinet
Public farmers and the government authorities could not agree on policies with regards to the frontier resulting in the 'Cape Frontier Rebellion' of 1795 where after the Boers declared Graaff-Reinet an independent republic. Following the Invasion of the Cape Colony in 1795, the British took possession of the area which led to another revolt in 1799, the uprising were suppressed by British troops that same year.

South African Republic

Louis Tregardt and Jan van Rensburg split off from Hendrik Potgieter's group, and continued on to establish Zoutpansberg. Potgieter's group remained at the Vet river and founded a town called Winburg.

The establishment of the South African Republic had its origins in 1837 when the commandos of Potgieter and Piet Uys defeated a Matabele raiding party of Mzilikazi and drove them back over the Limpopo river. Potgieter declared the lands north and south of the Vaal river as Boer lands. Boers started settling on both sides of the Vaal river and in March 1838, Potgieter, Uys and the men of their commando provided relief to Gerrit Maritz, and early in April 1838, Uys and his son were killed. During April 1838 Potgieter returned to the area north of the Vaal river and founded the town of Potchefstroom. At this time, this new country included the area north (Potchefstroom) and south (Winburg) of the Vaal river.

In 1848 the British Governor of the Cape, Sir Harry Smith, issued a proclamation declaring British sovereignty over all the lands to the north and to the south of the Vaal river. Commandant-General Andries Pretorius led the commandos against the British forces later that year, starting the First Boer War in which the Boers emerged victorious. The Volksraad from Winburg was transferred to Potchefstroom and the South African Republic (Dutch: Zuid-Afrikaansche Republiek; the ZAR) was established as the name of the new country.

The Boer Republics were predominately Calvinist Protestant due to their Dutch heritage, and this played a significant role in their culture. The ZAR national constitution did not provide separation between church and state, disallowing the franchise (citizenship) to anyone not a member of the Dutch Reformed Church. In 1858, these clauses were altered in the constitution to allow for the Volksraad to approve other Dutch Calvinist churches that separated from the Dutch Reformed Church in the wake of a number of splits. Members of the Roman Catholic Church and other Christian churches were not allowed to become citizens of the ZAR.

Zoutpansberg
The Zoutpansberg Boers came in 1835, settling along the Limpopo River, where they learnt gold working from the natives. The white settlers in Zoutpansberg had a long reputation of lawlessness, often being called typical "Back-veldt Boers". In 1864, they were inevitably incorporated into the South African Republic (Transvaal) after the Transvaal Civil War. As a district in the Republic, they had the largest native population in the South African Republic.

Natalia Republic

In April 1837, a party under leadership of Piet Retief arrived in Thabanchu. In June 1837, in Winburg, the newly elected Boer Volksraad appointed Piet Retief as Commandant-General. An argument between Maritz and Potgieter, both elected to the Volksraad, led to a split. Maritz and Piet Retief decided to secede from the Potgieter- and Uys-led Boer country. The Boers under the leadership of Piet Retief obtained a treaty from Zulu King Dingane to settle part of the lands the Zulus administered or held sway over, but Dingane later betrayed the treaty and slaughtered Retief and 70 members of his delegation. Dingane's impis (Zulu warriors) then killed almost 300 Boers who had settled in the Natal region.

After Pretorius was recruited to fill the leadership vacuum created by the deaths of Piet Retief and Maritz, he offered to negotiate for peace with Dingane if he were to restore the land he had offered to Retief. Dingane responded by attacking the Voortrekkers; on 16 December 1838 the battle of Ncome River (later named the Battle of Blood River) occurred, during which 300 Voortrekkers survived and won a decisive battle against thousands of Dingane's impis.

The Natalia Republic was established in 1839 by the local Boers after Pretorius entered into an alliance with Mpande, the new Zulu king.

Orange Free State

In June 1852 a public meeting was held in Bloemfontein where all the European people voted on a resolution whether to pursue independence or remain under British rule. The vast majority of people voted to remain under British rule. Sir Harry Smith, however, had instructions to hand the country over to the Boers. In 1853, Sir George Clerk was sent as special commissioner to give up the land and to establish self-rule. 16,000 people sent a delegation of representatives to inform Clerk that the people wished to remain governed by Britain. Clerk however had clear instructions to establish self-rule, and with a minority Boers represented by J.H. Hofmann, agreed to a convention of independence.

Goosen (Goshen)

The State of Goosen was founded by a group of Boer Mercenaries led by Nicolaas Claudius Gey van Pittius in November 1882. It unified with Stellaland on 6 August 1883.

Stellaland

West of the Transvaal 400 Boers allied with David Massouw, leader of the Koranna Khoisan tribe, when they invaded and took a piece of land, which they declared the Republic of Stellaland. The first president was Gerrit Jacobus van Niekerk and the town of Vryburg was founded and declared its capital. In 1883, The Republic of Stellaland united with The State of Goshen to form the United States of Stellaland.

New Republic

The New Republic (comprising the town of Vryheid) was established in 1884 on land given to the local Boers by the Zulu King Dinuzulu, the son of Cetshwayo, after he recruited local Boers to fight on his side. The Boers were promised and granted land for their services and were led by Louis Botha who would go on to prominence during the second Anglo-Boer War. This republic was later absorbed into the Transvaal/South African Republic.

Griqualand

States were also established by other population groups, most notably the Griqua, a subgroup of South Africa's heterogeneous and multiracial Coloured people. Most notable among these were Griqualand West and Griqualand East.

International recognition

The people north of the Vaal River in the South African Republic were recognised as an independent country by the United Kingdom with the signing of the Sand River Convention on 17 January 1852.

The Orange Free State was recognised by the UK on 17 February 1854. The Orange Free State became independent on 23 February 1854 with the signing of the Bloemfontein or Orange River Convention. The Orange Free State was nicknamed "the model republic".

The Transvaal and the Orange Free State developed into successful independent countries which were recognized by the Netherlands, France, Germany, Belgium, the United States, and Britain. These two countries continued to exist for several decades, despite the First Boer War with Britain. However, later developments, including the discovery of diamonds and gold in these states, led to the Second Boer War. In this war, the Transvaal and Orange Free State were defeated and annexed by the overwhelmingly larger British forces, ceasing to exist on 31 May 1902, with the signing of the Treaty of Vereeniging. A new British dominion, the Union of South Africa, was established under the South Africa Act 1909, in which the Transvaal and the Orange Free State became provinces along with the Cape and Natal.

2014 land claim
On 24 April 2014, political party Front Nasionaal (FN) submitted a land claim to the Land Claims Commissioner in Pretoria on behalf of the Afrikaner nation. The claim pertains to the land described in National Archives of South Africa R117/1846: "From Ohrigstad to the north till the Olifantsrivier, then downwards to the Delagoa Bay line; to the south till the Crocodile River; to the west to Elandspruit till the 26 degrees line; east till where the Crocodile River joins the Komati River." FN states that the sale of said land was between King Masous (representative of the Zulu) as seller; and Commandant SJZR Burg (representative of the Dutch South African nation) as buyer. A copy of the agreement is filed in the Government Archives under file R117/46. FN further states that the land was legally bought and paid for on 25 July 1846 as an ethnic group and not as individual landowners and was only in custodianship of the pre-1994 government as they were regarded as descendants of the ethnic group. There was therefore no legal right to hand this land over to a "foreign" government in April 1994 and away from the original ethnic group.

The new land claims process has not yet been finalised however.

List of states and republics

Boer republics 

  Freeburgher Colonies (1656–1795)
  Republic of Swellendam (1795)
  Republic of Graaff-Reinet (1795–1796)
  Zoutpansberg (1835–1864)
  Winburg (1836–1844)
  Potchefstroom (1837–1844)
  (1839–1843)
  Winburg-Potchefstroom (1844–1848)
  Republic of Klip River (1847–1848)
  Lydenburg Republic (1849–1860)
  Utrecht Republic (1852–1858)
  (1852–1877, 1881–1902)
  (1854–1902)
  Klein Vrystaat (1886–1891)
  State of Goshen (1882–1883)
  Republic of Stellaland (1882–1883)
  United States of Stellaland (1883–1885)
  New Republic (1884–1888)
  Republic of Upingtonia/Lijdensrust (1885–1887)

Griqua states 

 Griqualand East (1862–1879)
 Griqualand West (1870–1871)
 Philippolis/Adam Kok's Land (1826–1861)
 Waterboer's Land (1813–1871)

See also 

 Boer
 Burgher (Boer republics)
 Trekboers
 Afrikaner nationalism
 Afrikaner Calvinism
 History of South Africa

References

 
History of South Africa